09 may refer to:

 2009, the year, or any year ending with 09, which may be written as '09
 September, the ninth month
 9 (number)
 Ariège (department) (postal code), a French department
 Auckland, New Zealand, which has the telephone area code 09.
 09 (film), 2021 Kurdish crime thriller film directed by Bakhtyat Fatah.

See also
 O9 (disambiguation)
 9 (disambiguation)